Golf at the 2014 Summer Youth Olympics was held from 19 August to 26 August at the Zhongshan International Golf Club in Nanjing, China. This marked the debut of golf at the Youth Olympics as it was voted an Olympic sport for the 2016 Summer Olympics.

Qualification
Each National Olympic Committee (NOC) entered a maximum of 2 athletes, 1 male and 1 female. As hosts, China was initially given the maximum quota, but only selected a male athlete and a further 10 athletes were to be decided by the Tripartite Commission, but only seven were used, the rest were reallocated. The remaining 26 teams were decided by adding the ranking place of the top ranked eligible male and female golfers on the World Amateur Golf Rankings released on 8 June 2014. The 26 NOCs with the lowest combined rankings qualified.

To be eligible to participate at the Youth Olympics athletes must have been born between 1 January 1996 and 31 December 1998. Furthermore, all athletes must be amateur golfers who hold a recognised handicap index not exceeding 6.4.

Schedule

The schedule was released by the Nanjing Youth Olympic Games Organizing Committee.

All times are CST (UTC+8)

Medal summary

Medal table

Events

References

External links
Official Results Book – Golf

 
2014 Summer Youth Olympics events
Youth Summer Olympics
2014
Golf tournaments in China